Novara (It. Provincia di Novara) is a province in the Piedmont region of Italy. Its capital is the city of Novara.

In 1992, the new Province of Verbano-Cusio-Ossola was created through the fusion of three geographical areas which had previously been part of the Province of Novara.

It consists of 88 comuni (municipalities).

Colline Novaresi DOC

The province of Novara is home to the Denominazione di origine controllata (DOC) wine of Colline Novaresi which was created in 1994 for the red and white Italian wines of the area. All grapes destined for DOC wine production need to be harvested to a yield no greater than 11 tonnes/ha. The red wine is a blend of at least 30% Nebbiolo (known under the local name of Spanna), up to 40% Uva Rara and no more than 30% collectively of Croatina and Vespolina. Varietal styles of each of the red grape varieties can be made provided that the grape makes up at least 85% of the wine. The white wine is made 100% from the Erbaluce grape. The finished wine must attain a minimum alcohol level of 11% in order to be labelled with the Colline Novaresi DOC designation.

Populations

Notes

References
ISTAT

External links
Official website

 
Novara
Wine regions of Italy